Humanists UK,  known from 1967 until May 2017 as the British Humanist Association (BHA), is a charitable organisation which promotes secular humanism and aims to represent "people who seek to live good lives without religious or superstitious beliefs" in the United Kingdom by campaigning on issues relating to humanism, secularism, and human rights. It seeks to act as a representative body for non-religious people in the UK.

The charity also supports humanist and non-religious ceremonies in England and Wales, Northern Ireland, and the Crown dependencies and maintains a national network of accredited celebrants for humanist funeral ceremonies, weddings, and baby namings, in addition to a network of volunteers who provide like-minded support and comfort to non-religious people in hospitals and prisons. Its other charitable activities include providing free educational resources to teachers, parents, and institutions; a peer-to-peer support service for people who face difficulties leaving coercive religions and cults; work to promote tolerance and understanding between religious communities and the non-religious; and work to promote understanding of humanism. The current President of Humanists UK is Adam Rutherford and the Chief Executive is Andrew Copson. The association currently has 70 affiliated regional and special interest groups and claims a total of approximately 100,000 members and supporters.

Humanists UK also has sections which run as staffed national humanist organisations in both Wales and Northern Ireland. Wales Humanists and Northern Ireland Humanists each have an advisory committee drawn from the membership and a development officer. Wales Humanists and Northern Ireland Humanists campaign on devolved issues in Cardiff and Belfast and work to expand the provision of humanist ceremonies, pastoral care, and support for teachers in those countries.

Aims
The organisation's Articles of Association sets out its aims as:
 The advancement of Humanism, namely a non-religious ethical lifestance the essential elements of which are a commitment to human wellbeing and a reliance on reason, experience and a naturalistic view of the world.
 The advancement of education and in particular the study of and the dissemination of knowledge about Humanism and about the arts and science as they relate to Humanism.
 The promotion of equality and non-discrimination and the protection of human rights as defined in international instruments to which the United Kingdom is party, in each case in particular as relates to religion and belief.
 The promotion of understanding between people holding religious and non-religious beliefs so as to advance harmonious cooperation in society.

The organisation also wishes to build itself as a sustainable and nationally-recognised organisation as a voice for non-religious people.

History
The organisation was founded in 1896 by American Stanton Coit as the Union of Ethical Societies, which brought together existing ethical societies in Britain. Other important founding figures included Elizabeth Schwann (who presided over the inaugural conference), and the feminist writer Zona Vallance (its first Secretary). The writer and critic Leslie Stephen, father of Virginia Woolf, was also a founding figure; he had been President of one of the societies which federated as the Union of Ethical Societies. It changed its name to the Ethical Union in 1920 and was incorporated in 1928. In 1963 H. J. Blackham became the first Executive Director, and the society became the British Humanist Association in 1967, during the Presidency of philosopher A. J. Ayer.

This transition followed a decade of discussions which nearly prompted a merger of the Ethical Union with the Rationalist Press Association and the South Place Ethical Society. In 1963 the first two went as far as creating an umbrella Humanist Association of which Harold Blackham (later to become a President of Humanists UK) was the Executive Director. However, Humanists UK, the Rationalist Association and the South Place Ethical Society (now Conway Hall Ethical Society) remain separate entities today and in 1967 the Union of Ethical Societies alone became the British Humanist Association.

In the 1960s, the organisation campaigned for reform of the 1944 Education Act's clauses on religion in schools and it was active in the campaign to legalise abortion and homosexuality. It supported repeal of Sunday Observance laws and the end of theatre censorship, the provision of family planning on the NHS and other reforms. More generally Humanists UK aimed to defend freedom of speech, support the elimination of world poverty and remove the privileges given to religious groups. It was claimed in 1977 that Humanists UK aimed "to make humanism available and meaningful to the millions who have no alternative belief."

The local ethical societies united in 1896 had (mainly during the 1950s) renamed themselves as humanist groups and their number grew over time, becoming today Humanists UK's network of affiliated local humanist groups. A network of celebrants able to conduct non-religious funerals, weddings, naming ceremonies and same sex affirmations (before the law allowing gay civil partnerships) was also developed and continues today as Humanist Ceremonies.

Social concerns persisted in Humanists UK's programme. Humanists UK was a co-founder in 1969 of the Social Morality Council (later transmuted into the Norham Foundation), which brought together believers and unbelievers concerned with moral education and with finding agreed solutions to moral problems in society. Humanists UK was active in arguing for voluntary euthanasia and the right to obtain an abortion. It has always sought an "open society". It is credited with substantially popularising the salience and use of the concept in Britain. In 1969 it filled Royal Festival Hall for an influential conference on Towards an Open Society.

Humanists UK claimed that the rules on religious programming within the BBC constitute a "religious privilege" and reserve particular criticism for the Thought for the Day slot on Radio 4's Today programme. In April 2009 a "breakthrough" in Humanists UK's campaign saw Andrew Copson invited to participate as a humanist representative in the BBC's short-lived Standing Conference on Religion and Belief when it replaced the Central Religious Advisory Committee.

In May 2017, the organisation changed its operating name from the British Humanist Association to Humanists UK. Its chief executive, Andrew Copson, said that the change followed "a long, evidence-driven process with focus groups of non-religious people across the UK and research involving over 4,000 of our supporters...  Humanists UK represents not just a new logo, but a totally new, friendly look that captures the essence of humanism: open, inclusive, energetic, and modern, with people and their stories placed first and foremost...".

In 2021, Humanists UK celebrated its 125th anniversary. It launched a new Humanist Heritage website, cataloguing much of its 125-year history and the wider history of humanism in the UK, and received cross-party video messages of congratulations from the Leader of the Opposition and Labour, Sir Keir Starmer; the First Minister of Scotland and leader of the Scottish National Party, Nicola Sturgeon; from the leader of the Liberal Democrats, Sir Edward Davey; the co-leader of the Green Party of England and Wales, Siân Berry; and a warm letter of thanks from the Conservative UK Government.

Campaigns

Schools
The organisation opposes faith schools because "The majority of the evidence [...] points towards their being an unfair and unpopular part of our state education system which the majority of people in Britain want them phased out." In addition, they argue that faith schools are "exclusive, divisive and counter intuitive to social cohesion" and blame religious admissions procedures for "creating school populations that are far from representative of their local populations in religious or socio-economic terms."

While the organisation is opposed to faith schools receiving any state funding whatsoever, it supports the Fair Admissions Campaign which has a more limited scope because "it furthers our aims of ending religious discrimination and segregation in state schools; and secondly because we know how important this particular topic is."  The organisation campaigns for reform of Religious Education in the UK including a reformed subject covered by the national curriculum which is inclusive of non-religious viewpoints, such as "Belief and Values Education". They believe that "all pupils in all types of school should have the opportunity to consider philosophical and fundamental questions, and that in a pluralist society we should learn about each other's beliefs, including humanist ones".

They also support humanist volunteers on the local Standing Advisory Council on Religious Education which currently determine the Religious Education syllabus for each local authority. Educational issues have always featured prominently in Humanists UK campaigns activities, including efforts to abolish compulsory daily collective worship in schools and to reform Religious Education so that it is "Objective, Fair and Balanced" (the title of an influential 1975 booklet) and includes learning about humanism as an alternative life stance.

The organisation opposes the teaching of creationism in schools. In September 2011, Humanists UK launched their "Teach evolution, not creationism" campaign, which aimed to establish statutory opposition to creationism in the UK education system. The Department for Education amended the funding agreement for free schools to allow the withdrawal of funding if they teach creationism as established scientific fact. In 2019, Humanists UK's Wales Humanists branch revived the campaign in partnership with David Attenborough after the Welsh Department of Education omitted to include similar safeguards against teaching creationism in schools.

Humanists UK has long campaigned in opposition to collective worship laws in the UK which require all schools to hold school assemblies "of a broadly Christian character". In 2019, the charity backed two parents to take a human rights challenge to those laws, arguing that the state had a duty to treat non-religious pupils equally and by effectively isolating those who withdraw from compulsory worship, discrimination occurs. Later that year, Humanists UK launched a new website, Assemblies for All, which compiles school assembly resources from NGOs, charities, government sources, the BBC, and businesses to make it possible for teachers and school leaders to put on "inclusive assemblies" on diverse topics – including the environment, mental health, and public holidays – as opposed to the collective worship required by law.

Through its education website Understanding Humanism, the charity also provides resources to teachers who want to include humanist perspectives and information about humanism in lessons.

Constitutional reform
The organisation campaigns for a secular state, which it defines as "a state where public institutions are separate from religious institutions and treat all citizens impartially regardless of their religious or non-religious beliefs." It points to issues such as the joint role of the British monarch (both Supreme Governor of the Church of England and Head of State), the reserved places for bishops in the House of Lords, the status of the Church of England (the officially established church), and other "discriminations based on religion or belief within the system" such as those in education and Public Services.

Ethical issues

Humanists UK has supported the rights for those who need assistance in ending their own lives, and lobbied parliament for a change in the law, on behalf of Tony Nicklinson and Paul Lamb, in their 'Right to Die' legal cases. In 2014, it intervened in a Supreme Court case in which the court stated it would rule again on a potential declaration of incompatibility between restrictions on the right to die and the Human Rights Act should Parliament fail to legislate decisively. In February 2019 they helped form the Assisted Dying Coalition, a group of like-minded campaign groups seeking to legalise assisted dying for the terminally ill or incurably suffering.

Persistent campaigns include defending legal abortion in Great Britain and securing its decriminalisation and its legalisation in Northern Ireland, defending embryonic stem cell research for medical purposes, challenging the state funding of homeopathy through the National Health Service, and calling for consistent and humane law on the slaughter of animals. It has also campaigned for 'opt-out' organ donor registers to improve the availability of life-saving organs in the UK; Wales became the first part of the UK to adopt such a register in 2015. Jersey followed in 2019, to be followed by England in 2020.

The organisation also campaigns on marriage laws, demanding full equality for same-sex and humanist marriage ceremonies throughout the UK. Humanists UK had been providing same-sex wedding ceremonies for decades, and had strongly supported legalising same-sex marriage years in advance of eventual UK and Scottish legislation. In 2013, it secured an amendment to the same sex-marriage bill to require UK Government to consult on letting humanist celebrants conduct legal marriages. Though the consultation result strongly indicated that legalisation should go ahead, ministers have so far declined to use the order-making powers to effect the change. It also campaigns for same-sex and humanist marriages in Northern Ireland. In 2017, it supported a humanist couple to challenge Northern Ireland's refusal to give legal recognition to humanist marriages through the High Court in Belfast, which resulted in legalisation of humanist marriages in Northern Ireland in June 2017. After campaigning to legalise same-sex marriage in Northern Ireland, it celebrated its success with a promotional billboards across Belfast emblazoned, 'Love wins for everybody', advertising humanist ceremonies.

The charity has been consistently supportive of LGBT rights across its history. It was also among the first organisations to protest Section 28 in the late 1980s, and was one of the most vocal and longstanding advocates of a ban on gay conversion therapy, which it denounces as "religious pseudoscience" with harmful consequences. This eventually led to a 2018 commitment from the UK Government to ban the practice. Its humanist celebrants conducted non-legal partnership/wedding ceremonies for same-sex couples for many decades prior to the law changing.

Many of its campaigns are based on free speech and human rights legislation and it has based much of its campaigning on the Human Rights Act 1998. In 2008, the blasphemy law was repealed, an issue over which Humanists UK had long campaigned. It sought unification of existing anti-discrimination legislation and contributed to the Discrimination Law Review which developed the Equality Act 2006 and then the Equality Act 2010.

In the 2020s, Humanists UK was one of the charities at the forefront of campaigns to defend the Human Rights Act and the freedom to instigate judicial review from threats of being watered down or repealed. It assembled a large civil society coalition of charities, trade unions, and human rights organisations speaking in defence of the present settlement.

Public awareness

On 21 October 2008, Humanists UK lent its official support to Guardian journalist Ariane Sherine as she launched a fundraising drive to raise money for the UK's first atheist advertising campaign, the Atheist Bus Campaign. The campaign aimed to raise funds to place the slogan "There's probably no God. Now stop worrying and enjoy your life" on the sides of 30 London buses for four weeks in January 2009. Expecting to raise £5,500 over six months, the atheist author Richard Dawkins agreed to match donations up to £5,500 to make £11,000 total. The campaign raised over £153,000, enabling a nationwide advertising campaign to be launched on 6 January 2009.

On 8 January 2009 Christian Voice announced they had made an official complaint to the Advertising Standards Authority asserting that the Atheist Bus slogan broke rules on "substantiation and truthfulness". In total the ASA received 326 complaints about the campaign, with many claiming that the wording was offensive to the religious, however Humanists UK contested the complaint and commented on the plausibility of the ASA making a claim as to the "probability of God's existence". Robert Winston criticised the campaign as "arrogant". The ASA ruled that the slogan was not in breach of advertising code.

In 2011, Humanists UK campaigned to get atheists, agnostics and other non-believers to tick the "no religion" box in response to the optional religion question in the 2011 census (as opposed to writing in either a joke religion like "Jedi" or ticking the religion one grew up in). Humanists UK believed the question was worded in such a way as to increase the number of currently non-religious or nominally religious people who list the religion they grew up in rather than their current religious views, and thus the results would have been skewed to make the country seem more religious than it actually is. Humanists UK believes that this supposed overstatement of religious belief creates a situation where "public policy in matters of religion and belief will unduly favour religious lobbies and discriminate against people who do not live their lives under religion".

Posters for the campaign which used the slogan "If you're not religious, for God's sake say so" were refused by companies owning advertising hoardings in railway stations following advice from the Advertising Standards Authority who believe the adverts had "the potential to cause widespread and serious offence".

The Census results for England and Wales showed that 14.1 million people, about a quarter of the entire population (25%), stated they had no religion at all, a rise of 6.4 million since the 2001 census. Humanists UK said the fall in the number of Christians from 72% to below 60% was "astounding", and calculated that they could be in a minority by 2018.

Set up in 2010, the Resolution Revolution campaign aims to "[recast] the tired old New Year resolution – so often about breaking a negative habit – as a pledge to do something positive for others". Participation is open to all and not restricted to humanists or the non-religious.

In 2014, Humanists UK launched two public awareness campaigns. The first, called "That's Humanism!", was an Internet-based campaign revolving around four videos on humanist responses to ethics, happiness, death, and the scientific method, as narrated by its distinguished supporter, Stephen Fry. The videos, which were widely shared on social media, were intended to introduce non-religious people who were humanist in their outlook to the existence of a community of like-minded people living their lives on the basis of reason and empathy. The second campaign, called "Thought for the Commute", was a London Underground campaign featuring posters depicting humanist responses from Virginia Woolf, George Eliot, Bertrand Russell and A.C. Grayling to the question "What's it all for?" The campaign intended to be a positive introduction to Humanism for commuters, as well as to highlight the exclusion of humanist voices from BBC slots such as Thought for the Day. After announcing that it intended to replicate it in other UK cities, the campaign moved to bus posters in Birmingham, Manchester and Liverpool for four weeks in November and December 2014, this time depicting humanist responses from Jim Al-Khalili, Jawaharlal Nehru, Natalie Haynes and Russell once again.

Organisation

Presidents

Prior to the creation of a President of the Union of Ethical Societies in 1918, and that of Chair in 1916, several others held the equivalent role of Chair of the Annual Congress. The very first of these was a woman, the philanthropist and activist Lady Elizabeth Swann, who was the wife of a prominent liberal MP. She presided over the founding Congress of the Union in 1896. Other early chairs of the Annual Congress included then-future Prime Minister Ramsay MacDonald (1900-1901 and again in 1903).

In April 2011, it was announced that Professor A.C. Grayling would succeed Polly Toynbee as president of Humanists UK in July 2011. However, in June Humanists UK announced that Professor Grayling had decided not to take up that position, because of what he described as "controversy generated by activities in another area of my public life." Humanists UK stated that Polly Toynbee would continue as President until a new appointment was made later in 2011; she remained President for a further 18 months until in December 2012 it was announced that physicist Jim Al-Khalili would become President in January 2013.

Staff
 Andrew Copson – Chief Executive
 Richy Thompson – Director of Public Affairs and Policy
 Liam Whitton - Director of Communications and Development
 Vicky Ball - Head of People
 Luke Donnellan – Director of Understanding Humanism
 Deborah Hooper - Head of Ceremonies
 Clare Elcombe Webber – Head of Humanist Care
 Catriona McLellan – Director of Operations 
 Andrew West – Director of IT

The charity also contracts an officer on the ground both in Wales and Northern Ireland, who coordinate its national sections (or branches) Wales Humanists and Northern Ireland Humanists. These officers are in turn supported by national committees of volunteers whose advice assists the charity's service delivery in those countries, strategic litigation, and lobbying on devolved issues at the Northern Ireland Assembly and National Assembly for Wales.

Humanist celebrants

Humanist equivalents of otherwise religious celebrations are conducted by humanist celebrants, trained and accredited by Humanists UK across England, Wales and Northern Ireland, while the Humanist Society Scotland performs similar ceremonies in Scotland.  Non-religious funerals are legal within the UK; over 8,000 funerals are carried out by humanist celebrants in England and Wales each year. Between 600 and 900 weddings and 500 baby namings per year are also conducted by Humanists UK-accredited celebrants. In England and Wales, a humanist wedding or partnership ceremony must be supplemented by a process of obtaining a civil marriage or partnership certificate through a Register Office to be legally recognised, but can be led by a Humanist celebrant.

The humanist funeral for former Welsh First Minister Rhodri Morgan at the Welsh Assembly was conducted by a Humanists UK celebrant, Lorraine Barrett and was the first national funeral in the United Kingdom to be led by a humanist celebrant.

Since 2018, Humanists UK celebrants have been able to conduct legally recognised marriages in Northern Ireland. This came about after Humanists UK supported a court case centring around its patrons, couple Laura Lacole and Eunan O'Kane.

Pastoral carers

Humanists UK maintains a network of roughly 150 trained and accredited volunteers in England, Wales, and Northern Ireland who go into hospitals, hospices, prisons, universities, and other settings to provide like-minded comfort and support to non-religious people during times of distress, much like a traditional religious chaplain. This network is known as the Non-Religious Pastoral Support Network. The project was initiated by data evidence which suggested that non-religious patients and inmates often refused support from a chaplain if they were themselves non-religious. Since 2014, the National Offender Management Service has recognised the legal right of prisoners to access non-religious pastoral carers, and since 2015, NHS England has recommended that every hospital in England offers a voluntary or employed non-religious carer. In 2018, Lindsay van Dijk was appointed as the first humanist to lead an NHS chaplaincy team at the Buckinghamshire Healthcare NHS trust, which includes the world-renowned spinal injuries unit at Stoke Mandeville hospital. The current chair of NRPSN is Amy Walden.

Young Humanists 

Young Humanists is the organisation's youth wing, which launched early in 2015 with a number of events in cities across the UK.

Patrons
Numerous prominent people from the worlds of science, philosophy, the arts, politics, and entertainment are publicly aligned with Humanists UK, including Professor Alice Roberts, Tim Minchin, Stephen Fry, Matty Healy, Sandi Toksvig, Philip Pullman, and Dan Snow.

In the 20th century, key members of Humanists UK's "advisory council" included Karl Popper, Vanessa Redgrave, Harold Pinter, E M Forster, Bertrand Russell, John Maynard Smith, Harry Kroto, Ludovic Kennedy, Jacob Bronowski, and Barbara Wootton.

Affiliations
Humanists UK is a founding member of Humanists International, and the European Humanist Federation.

In September 2008, Humanists UK joined with religious organisations, teachers' unions, and other human rights campaigns groups to found the Accord Coalition, a diverse coalition made up of groups that oppose religious segregation in education.

Humanist Students is a national federation of atheist, humanist, secularist, and skeptic societies at universities and is part of Humanists UK. Its elected delegates traditionally, alongside members of Young Humanists, represent Humanists UK at Young Humanists International events.

Humanists UK has traditionally worked closely with the British Pregnancy Advisory Service, which was founded by the President of Birmingham Humanists, sexologist Martin Cole, in 1968. Humanists UK was a founding member of the BPAS "We Trust Women" coalition, which campaigns for the full decriminalisation of abortion throughout the UK.

The organisation supports a network of affiliated humanist groups throughout the UK and aims to encourage local campaigning, charity work, socialising, and events on a local level, and provides resources to assist the creation and running of such groups. Some of these groups are formally partnered with Humanists UK, which entitles them to added staff and promotional support, while others maintain a looser affiliate agreement. As of 2017, the number of partner groups stands at 47, with 15 affiliates.

The charity has also sponsored philosophical debates at HowTheLightGetsIn Festival.

Lecture series
Humanists UK runs a prestigious annual events programme, including the Darwin Day Lecture (on themes connected with Darwin's work and humanism), the Rosalind Franklin Lecture (commemorating women in humanism), the Voltaire Lecture (on humanism more generally), the Bentham Lecture (co-hosted with University College London's philosophy department), the Holyoake Lecture (held in Manchester and covering humanism and political thought), and an annual convention which moves around the UK from year to year.

Past speakers at these events include top scientists, authors, and academics, including Steven Pinker, Brian Cox, Richard Dawkins, Robert Hinde, AC Grayling, Natalie Haynes, Bonya Ahmed, Bettany Hughes, Alice Roberts, Nick Cohen, Ludovic Kennedy, Michael Foot, Lawrence Krauss, Eugenie Scott, Adam Rutherford, Tom Blundell, and Jerry Coyne, Anne Glover, Angela Saini, Sarah-Jayne Blakemore, Jim Al-Khalili, Owen Jones, and Kate Pickett.

Annual award

From 2011 Humanists UK presented an annual award for special contributions to Humanism. It is known as the Humanist of the Year Award, having been known prior to 2014 as the Services to Humanism Award. The award was customarily presented during Humanists UK annual conference (or, in 2014, the UK-hosted World Humanist Congress). Since 2016 it has been presented at a special reception event. Past winners are:
 2011: Philip Pullman, Services to Humanism Award
 2012: Richard Dawkins, Services to Humanism Award
 2013: Terry Pratchett, Humanist of the Year Award
 2014: Gulalai Ismail and Wole Soyinka, International Humanist of the Year Award (both presented as part of World Humanist Congress)
 2015: Alice Roberts, Humanist of the Year Award 
 2016: Lord Dubs, Humanist of the Year Award
 2017: Joan Bakewell, Humanist of the Year Award
 2018: Northern Ireland Humanist Campaigners (Laura Lacole, Eunan O'Kane, Steven McQuitty, Ciaran Moynagh, Caolfhionn Gallagher QC, Janet Farrell, and Sarah Ewart accepting), Humanists of the Year Award.

Earlier awardees include A.J. Ayer, Leo Igwe, Polly Toynbee, and Julian Huxley.

Criticism
In January 2008 Humanists UK (known as the BHA at the time) and the National Secular Society approached the Scouts Association about a conflict between the claims of inclusivity on their website and their oath. In February 2008 journalists Bryan Appleyard and Deborah Orr criticised both Humanists UK and the National Secular Society for the (ultimately successful) campaign to end discrimination against non-religious children in the Scouts' Oath of Allegiance. In April 2008 Jonathan Petre, The Daily Telegraph religious affairs journalist, countered this position pointing out that the Scout Oath of Allegiance was discriminatory. After consultation with Humanists UK over a five-year period, Girlguiding UK in June 2013 and eventually the UK Scout Association in October 2013 recognised the discrimination and amended their oaths to accommodate non-religious young people from 1 January 2014.

Professor Alice Roberts was criticised for sending her child to a faith school, despite Humanists UK's campaign against state-funded religious schools. She responded that this was the very point of the campaign: that she, like many other parents, had little choice over where to send her child and that she would have preferred a non-faith school option local to her.

See also
All Party Parliamentary Humanist Group
Atheist, Humanist, and Secular Students
Disestablishmentarianism
LGBT Humanists UK
Non-Prophet Week
Separation of church and state (UK)

References

External links

Humanists UK website
Archives of the BHA at Bishopsgate Library

Charities based in England
European Humanist Federation
Humanist associations
Organisations based in the London Borough of Islington
Organizations established in 1896
Secular humanism
Secularism in the United Kingdom
Secularist organizations
1896 establishments in the United Kingdom